"The Dayz of Wayback" is the third and final single by American hip hop group N.W.A, performed by Dr. Dre and MC Ren featuring Admiral Dancehall from their second and last full-length studio album, Niggaz4Life. It was only released as a single in the UK.

1991 singles
1991 songs
Gangsta rap songs
G-funk songs
N.W.A songs
Ruthless Records singles
Song recordings produced by Dr. Dre
Songs written by Dr. Dre
Songs written by MC Ren
Songs written by The D.O.C.
Diss tracks